The Westgard rules are a set of statistical patterns, each being unlikely to occur by random variability, thereby raising a suspicion of faulty accuracy or precision of the measurement system. They are used for laboratory quality control, in "runs" consisting of measurements of multiple samples. They are a set of modified Western Electric rules, developed by James Westgard and provided in his books and seminars on quality control. They are plotted on Levey–Jennings charts, wherein the X-axis shows each individual sample, and the Y-axis shows how much each one differs from the mean in terms of standard deviation (SD). The rules are:

The recommended consequences when any of the above patterns occur is to reject the run, except for the rule of 12s (top in table), which serves as a warning and a recommendation of careful inspection of the data.

See also
Western Electric rules
Nelson rules

References

External links

Quality control